Lazare Escarguel (1816–1893) was a French politician and newspaper editor.

Biography
Elected as a councillor in Perpignan in 1865, Lazare Escarguel became the mayor of that city in 1870. The following year, he was elected as a member of the National Assembly for Pyrénées-Orientales, and was reelected in 1876, 1877 (against Colonel Falcon with 13,235 votes vs 8,276) and in 1881. Escarguel is then elected as a senator for Pyrénées-Orientales from 1882 to 1891. He finally retired in his birth town, where he died in 1893 of apoplexy.

Lazare Escarguel was also a founding member of the newspaper L'Indépendant for its second start in 1868.

References

1816 births
1893 deaths
People from Aude
Politicians from Occitania (administrative region)
Republican Union (France) politicians
Members of the National Assembly (1871)
Members of the 1st Chamber of Deputies of the French Third Republic
Members of the 2nd Chamber of Deputies of the French Third Republic
Members of the 3rd Chamber of Deputies of the French Third Republic
French Senators of the Third Republic
Senators of Pyrénées-Orientales
French newspaper editors